Veronica arenaria is a flowering plant species in the family Plantaginaceae. It is native to New South Wales and Queensland Australia.

References

Flora of New South Wales
Flora of Queensland
arenaria